Paddy Brown is a Northern Irish politician who is an Alliance Party Member of the Legislative Assembly (MLA). He was elected as an MLA in the 2022 Northern Ireland Assembly election for South Down.

Early life
Brown grew up in Crossgar and Downpatrick where he attended integrated schools, including Shimna Integrated College. Brown went to University of Sheffield, where he received his bachelor's degree and master's degrees in political science and international development respectively.

Upon his return to Northern Ireland, Brown started several small businesses, including a water and sanitation charity doing work in East Africa and a firm that supports social enterprises and other third sector organizations.

Brown was awarded his Ph.D. on Universal basic income and Conflict transformation at Queen's University Belfast only weeks after his election in May 2022's Assembly elections in Northern Ireland.

Political career
During his undergraduate studies, Brown did a two-week work placement in Naomi Long's office in Westminster.

In 2014, Brown was one of the youngest people to be elected as a Councillor in Newry, Mourne and Down District Council. In March 2017, Brown was arrested for drink driving his motorbike. His case was referred to the council's standards watchdog, who suspended Brown from his council duties for six months. He was re-elected five years later in the 2019 local elections.

Brown first ran for the Northern Ireland Assembly in 2016, achieving Alliances best result in the South Down constituency up to that date with 5.36% of the vote. In the 2017 Assembly elections Brown almost doubled his vote to 9.18%, narrowly missing the 5th seat.

Brown won 13.9% of the vote in the 2019 UK Parliamentary election in South Down, placing 4th overall with 6916 votes.

In the 2022 Assembly election, Brown was the 3rd candidate elected in South Down, winning 6942 first preference votes. Notably, Brown became the first Alliance MLA for South Down, a largely Nationalist constituency.

Electoral Record

References

External links 

Living people
Alliance Party of Northern Ireland MLAs
Northern Ireland MLAs 2022–2027
Year of birth missing (living people)
Alliance Party of Northern Ireland councillors
21st-century politicians from Northern Ireland